Calculated  is the only studio album by the American punk rock band Heavens to Betsy, released on March 21, 1994, by Kill Rock Stars. The album received positive reviews from critics.

Recording and release 
Calculated was recorded in Seattle, Washington, between November 30 and December 3, 1993. It was released on March 21, 1994, by the independent record label Kill Rock Stars.

Critical reception 

Calculated received positive reviews from music critics. AllMusic reviewer Kurt Morris stated that "Sawyer keeps the beats tight and Tucker is always brimming over with passion and the kind of power of which many bands in the hardcore scene aren't even capable. Not so much in an overtly masculine manner, but through intelligently refined viciousness transmitted via the appropriate musical spectrum". Similarly, Robert Christgau highlighted Tucker's noisy guitar playing as well as Sawyer's controlled drumming. Trouser Press wrote that "despite the pair’s rudimentary instrumental skills, the songs are well formed, and their contrasting vocal styles (Tucker’s warbly fortitude versus Sawyer’s spine-chilling screams) create a mighty tension."

Track listing

Personnel 
Credits are adapted from Allmusic.
Corin Tucker – vocals, guitar, drums
Tracy Sawyer – bass, drums, guitar, sound effects 
Gloria Anzaldúa – editing
James Bertram – photography
Tiffany Clendenin – photography
John Goodmanson – engineer
Heavens to Betsy – producer

References

External links 

1994 albums
Heavens to Betsy albums
Kill Rock Stars albums